Zoogloea ramigera is a gram-negative, aerobic bacterium from the genus of Zoogloea which occurs in organically enriched aqueous environments like activated sludges.

References

External links
Type strain of Zoogloea ramigera at BacDive -  the Bacterial Diversity Metadatabase

Rhodocyclaceae